Triggerfish describes a technology of cell phone interception and surveillance using a mobile cellular base station (microcell or picocell).  The devices are also known as cell-site simulators or digital analyzers.

Device capability

 Tracking of a cell phone by a mobile FBI van (Wireless Intercept and Tracking Team) that seeks to locate a cell phone lacking GPS tracking by scanning for its emissions.  This first became known for its use in tracking hacker Kevin Mitnick.
 Intercepting a cell phone call by a man-in-the-middle attack, if the option is enabled, and the user makes or receives a call.

Controversy and concerns

Neither the user nor the cell phone provider need to know about Triggerfish for it to be used successfully.  A court order is required, but the device circumvents provisions of CALEA barring use of pen register or trap-and-trace devices.

The device is similar to but distinct from an IMSI catcher.

On March 28, 2013, the Washington Post reported that federal investigators "routinely" use the systems to track criminal suspects, but sometimes fail to explain the technology sufficiently to magistrate judges from whom they seek search warrants.

On May 26, 1993, Harris Corporation sent a threatening letter to then publisher of Full Disclosure, Glen L Roberts regarding his publication of article(s) about their product named, Triggerfish. In the letter, Harris referred to his articles as "advertisements" and said, "Your  issue No. 24 of Full Disclosure has been brought to my attention because  of  an  apparently unauthorized advertisement on page 8 for a Harris  law enforcement product referred to as "Triggerfish." It is my understanding  that  the  publication  of  this  advertisement was not previously  requested  nor authorized by Harris. The unapproved use of this advertisement constitutes a deceptive trade practice, which would potentially  subject  you  and  your  newspaper  to  civil  liability. Further,  you  have  used  our trademarks—Harris and Triggerfish—without permission." and "Lastly,  you  may  have committed a felony under 18 USC 2512(1)(c)(i). This  criminal  statute  prohibits  the  placement  in  a newspaper or magazine  of  an  advertisement  for  an  electronic  product  that is primarily  useful  for  the  purpose  of  surreptitiously intercepting  electronic  communications." Roberts apparently first wrote about the Triggerfish in 1991.

References in popular culture 
Referenced in the movie "Ambulance" for the purposes of identifying transmitting devices within the ambulance. (Released April, 2022)
An unrealistic, mocked-up "Triggerfish device" was used in season three, episode 11, 'Middle Ground', of the HBO show The Wire.
A functioning Triggerfish is shown in an episode of the TV series The X-Files.
A functioning Triggerfish is shown in an episode of the TV series Millennium.
In season 17, episode 18 of Law & Order: Special Victims Unit, mention is made of using Triggerfish to locate a missing nun with a burner cellphone.
In season 4, Episode 21 of The Unit, a cellphone is used as a "remote triggerfish."

See also 
DCSNet
Dirtbox (cell phone)
Stingray phone tracker

References 

Signals intelligence
Surveillance
Telephone tapping